Tegyulte (Tögülte) is a rural locality (a selo), one of three settlements, in addition to Onnyos and Yefremovo, in Amgino-Nakharinsky Rural Okrug of Aldansky District in the Sakha Republic, Russia. Its population as of the 2010 Census was 13; up from 9 recorded in the 2002 Census.

Climate

References

Notes

Sources
Official website of the Sakha Republic. Registry of the Administrative-Territorial Divisions of the Sakha Republic. Amginsky District. 

Rural localities in Amginsky District